Chatino may refer to:
 Chatinos, an ethnic group of Mexico
 Chatino languages, a group of languages of Mexico

Language and nationality disambiguation pages